Characters and Observations is an anonymous 18th-century manuscript that was discovered and published in 1930.  The American edition was published by Frederick A. Stokes Company. According to the foreword by Lord Gorrell, the handwritten manuscript was discovered in a piece of furniture by one John Murray in 1919, and ten years later shown to the editors of The Daily Mail, who suggested having it published.  It was almost certainly owned by Alexander Pope, and is possibly his work.  The title page of the manuscript had "A Pope. Twikeam." written on it.

The work consists of aphorisms, wisecracks, and longer-form descriptions of general subjects and personality types.  The contents are arranged by subject, as follows:

Benefits
Gratitude
Praise
Censure
Time
Party
The Pulpit and the Bar
Alderman
School-Master
Physician
Physician and Patient
Law
Books
Knowledge and Learning
Virtue
Religion
Offices
Greatness
Folly
Pride
Covetuousness (sic)
Revenge
Flattery
Friendship
Merit
Youth and Old Age
Sons and Daughters
Courtship
Woman
Beauty
Love
Marriage
Poverty
Riches
Heirs
Family
Kings
Passions
Meat and Drink
Trade
Compliments
Custom
Opinion
Conversation
Virtue
Miscellaneous Thoughts

Several of the aphorisms were selected by John Gross for inclusion in his 1981 book The Oxford Book of Aphorisms.

Works by Alexander Pope
Anonymous works
18th-century manuscripts
Books of aphorisms
Frederick A. Stokes Company books